Mike Peplinski (born February 11, 1974) is an American curler from La Crosse, Wisconsin. He was named Male Athlete of the Year by the United States Curling Association in 1994. Peplinski was the vice-skip for the Tim Somerville team at the 1998 Winter Olympics. They ended up losing the bronze medal game to Norway.

References

External links

Living people
1974 births
Sportspeople from La Crosse, Wisconsin
American male curlers
Curlers at the 1998 Winter Olympics
Olympic curlers of the United States